Ulsan Stadium is a multi-purpose stadium located in Ulsan Sports Complex, Ulsan, South Korea. Originally, there was Ulsan Civic Stadium at the same location which opened in 1970. The original stadium was demolished in 2003 and replaced with Ulsan Sport Complex. Ulsan Sports Complex consists of the Ulsan Stadium and Dongchun Gymnasium. Ulsan Stadium is a multi-purpose stadium which is mainly used for football; it was the home ground of the Ulsan Hyundai before they moved to Ulsan Munsu Football Stadium in 2001 and was the home stadium of Ulsan Hyundai Mipo Dockyard between 2005 and 2016. The stadium has a capacity for 19,471 spectators.

See also
Ulsan Civic Stadium

External links
 Official website 
 World Stadiums profile

Athletics (track and field) venues in South Korea
Football venues in South Korea
Multi-purpose stadiums in South Korea
Sports venues in Ulsan
Sports venues completed in 2005
K League 1 stadiums